José Marzán Jr. is an American comic book writer and artist. Over his career he has worked on many titles including Action Comics, Final Night, Marvel Comics Presents, Nightwing and Y: The Last Man.

He was the regular inker on The Flash for over nine years, from issues 38 (May 1990) to #151 (August, 1999), through many penciler changes.

External links
Official site
Jose Marzan Jr. at the Comic Book Database

American comics artists
Living people
Eisner Award winners for Best Penciller/Inker or Penciller/Inker Team
American Splendor artists
Year of birth missing (living people)